Bow and Bromley was a constituency in the Parliament of the United Kingdom. Located in the Metropolitan Borough of Poplar in London, it was created by the Redistribution of Seats Act for the 1885 general election and returned one Member of Parliament (MP) until it was abolished for the 1950 general election.

History

The area had been part of the former two-seat Tower Hamlets constituency, which was divided at the 1885 general election.

The constituency was marginal before 1918. The party holding the seat changed in 1886, 1892, 1895, 1906, January 1910, December 1910 and 1912. After the extension of the franchise to all adult men and some women in 1918, the seat became a safe Labour seat from 1922.

George Lansbury was first elected in December 1910 as a Labour candidate. He was on the left-wing of the party and was known as a pacifist and supporter of votes for women. In November 1912, Lansbury resigned his seat so he could test public opinion on women's suffrage. He lost the subsequent by-election and did not regain the seat until 1922.

Lansbury was the only member of the cabinet of the Second Labour Ministry to both remain with the party and secure re-election at the 1931 general election. As the party leader Arthur Henderson was not in the House of Commons, Lansbury became Acting Leader of the Labour Party and Leader of the Opposition. In 1932, Henderson resigned the leadership and Lansbury was elected leader in his place. He retained the leadership until 1935.

Boundaries
In 1885 the area was administered as part of The Metropolis. It was located in the Tower division, in the east of the county of Middlesex. The neighbourhoods of Bow and Bromley were combined to form a division of the parliamentary borough of Tower Hamlets. The parliamentary division was part of the East End of London. The Bromley in this seat is not the same place as Bromley, South London after which the Bromley constituency, created in 1918, was named.

In 1889 the Tower division of Middlesex was severed from the county. It became part of the County of London. In 1900 the lower tier of local government in London was re-modelled. Bow and Bromley became part of the Metropolitan Borough of Poplar.

When a re-distribution of parliamentary seats took place in 1918, the constituency became a division of Poplar. It comprised the wards of Bow Central, Bow North, Bow South, Bow West, Bromley North East, Bromley North West, and Bromley South West.

Members of Parliament
Constituency created (1885)

Constituency abolished (1950)

Election results

Elections in the 1880s

Elections in the 1890s

Elections in the 1900s

Elections in the 1910s

Elections in the 1920s

Elections in the 1930s

Elections in the 1940s

References

 Boundaries of Parliamentary Constituencies 1885-1972, compiled and edited by F.W.S. Craig (Parliamentary Reference Publications 1972)
 British Parliamentary Election Results 1885-1918, compiled and edited by F.W.S. Craig (The Macmillan Press 1974)
 British Parliamentary Election Results 1918-1949, compiled and edited by F.W.S. Craig (The Macmillan Press 1977)
 Who's Who of British Members of Parliament: Volume III 1919-1945, edited by M. Stenton and S. Lees (The Harvester Press 1976)

Politics of the London Borough of Tower Hamlets
Parliamentary constituencies in London (historic)
Constituencies of the Parliament of the United Kingdom established in 1885
Constituencies of the Parliament of the United Kingdom disestablished in 1950
Bow, London